Lucas Braga Ribeiro (born 10 November 1996), known as Lucas Braga or simply Braga, is a Brazilian footballer who plays for Santos as a forward.

Club career

Early career
Born in São Paulo, Braga joined J. Malucelli's youth setup in August 2016. Promoted to the main squad for the 2017 season, he made his senior debut on 30 March of that year, coming on as a second-half substitute in a 1–0 away loss against PSTC.

After administrative problems, Braga left the club and joined Batel also in the Paraná state, to play for the club in the state's third division. He scored his first senior goal at the club, netting the opener in a 4–0 home routing of União Futebol Clube de Nova Fátima on 5 November 2017.

Luverdense
On 12 January 2018, Braga signed for Luverdense of the Série C. Regularly used by his new club, he scored his first goal for the club on 14 May, netting the last in a 4–1 home routing of Volta Redonda.

On 28 August 2018, Braga was loaned to Série B side Vila Nova on loan until the end of the season. He contributed with six appearances before returning to his parent club for the 2019 season.

Santos

B-team
On 29 December 2018, it was announced that Braga had agreed to a pre-contract with Santos. He signed a contract until June 2022 the following 5 June, after his deal with his previous club expired, and started to appear for the under-23s.

Loans to Cuiabá and Inter de Limeira
On 9 September 2019, Braga moved to Cuiabá in the second division, on loan until the end of the campaign. On 13 December, he was announced at Inter de Limeira, also in a temporary deal. He impressed during his spell at the latter, scoring once against Oeste on 23 July.

Breakthrough
On 5 August 2020, Braga returned to Santos and was assigned to the main squad. He made his debut for the club on 20 August, coming on as a second-half substitute for Kaio Jorge in a 1–0 away win against Sport Recife for the Série A championship.

Braga made his Copa Libertadores debut on 1 October 2020, replacing Yeferson Soteldo late into a 3–2 away win against Club Olimpia. He scored his first goal for the club twenty days later, netting the equalizer in a 2–1 home win against Defensa y Justicia.

After the departure of Soteldo to Toronto FC, Braga established himself as an undisputed starter. On 20 May 2021, he signed a new five-year contract, until April 2026.

Career statistics

References

External links

1996 births
Living people
Footballers from São Paulo
Brazilian footballers
Association football forwards
Campeonato Brasileiro Série A players
Campeonato Brasileiro Série B players
Campeonato Brasileiro Série C players
J. Malucelli Futebol players
Luverdense Esporte Clube players
Vila Nova Futebol Clube players
Santos FC players
Cuiabá Esporte Clube players
Associação Atlética Internacional (Limeira) players